Nasir Uddin Chowdhury is a politician in Sunamganj District of Sylhet Division of Bangladesh. He was elected Member of Parliament from the Sunamganj-2 (Derai-Shala) seat for the Jatiya Party in the June 1996 7th parliamentary elections.

Birth and early life 
Nasir Uddin Chowdhury 1991-12-17 was born in Sunamganj district of Sylhet division.

Political life 
Nasir Uddin Chowdhury is a central member of the Bangladesh Nationalist Party. He was elected Member of Parliament from the Sunamganj-2 (Derai-Shala) seat for the Jatiya Party in the June 1996 7th parliamentary elections. He was defeated by participating in the elections for the BNP in the Jatiya Sangsad elections of 2001, 2008 and 2018.

See also 
 June 1996 Bangladeshi general election
 Sunamganj-2
 Bangladesh Nationalist Party

References

External links 
 List of 7th Parliament Members – Bangladesh parliament

People from Sunamganj District
Bangladesh Nationalist Party politicians
Living people
7th Jatiya Sangsad members
Year of birth missing (living people)